AS Biton is a Malian football club based in Ségou. They play in the Malian Second Division, with their last appearance in the Premiere Division coming in the 2006/07 season. Their home stadium is Stade Amari Daou.

References

Football clubs in Mali
Ségou
Association football clubs established in 1979
1979 establishments in Mali